This or That is the collaborative album by American hip hop artists Sway & King Tech and DJ Revolution. It was released on June 15, 1999, through Interscope Records. Production was handled mostly by King Tech & DJ Revolution, except for several tracks were produced by Cut Chemist, DJ Nu-Mark, KutMasta Kurt, Main Source and RZA. It features guest appearances from Big Daddy Kane, Canibus, Chill Rob G, Chino XL, Crooked I, Dilated Peoples, Eminem, EPMD, Eric B. & Rakim, Gang Starr, Heltah Skeltah, Inspectah Deck, Jayo Felony, Jurassic 5, Kool Keith, KRS-One, Main Source, Malik B., Pete Rock & CL Smooth, Pharoahe Monch, Planet Asia, Redman, RZA, Tech N9ne and Xzibit among others.

The album was a mild success, peaking at 107 on the Billboard 200 and 30 on the Top R&B/Hip-Hop Albums.

Both a single and promotional music video was released for the song "The Anthem".

Track listing

Charts

References

External links

1999 albums
Sway & King Tech albums
Interscope Records albums
Albums produced by RZA
Collaborative albums